Seven Kings is a district of Ilford in London, England, part of the borough of Redbridge. Situated approximately two miles from Ilford town centre, Seven Kings forms part of the Ilford post town. Historically part of Essex, it was part of the Municipal Borough of Ilford until 1965 when it was incorporated into Greater London.

History
The earliest recorded use of the name is as Sevekyngg or Sevekyngges in 1285, possibly meaning 'settlement of the family or followers of a man called Seofoca'.

Seven Kings has not historically formed a parish or other division; instead it was part of the ancient parish of Ilford in the Becontree hundred of the county of Essex, which formed from 1894, the Ilford Urban District (later municipal borough). Seven Kings is situated next to the ancient Roman road between London and Colchester and was rapidly developed during the 19th century following construction of the Great Eastern Main Line railway.

In 1965, the Ilford parish and municipal borough were abolished by the London Government Act 1963, and the area of Essex including Seven Kings has since formed part of Greater London.

Education

Located in the immediate area are Mayfield High School (London), Palmer Catholic Academy, Seven Kings High School and Isaac Newton Academy secondary school. Primary schools in this area include Downshall Primary School, Farnham Green Primary School, South Park Primary School, Seven Kings Primary School, Isaac Newton Academy primary school, and Eastcourt Independent School.

Transport
The area is served by Seven Kings railway station on the Great Eastern Main Line to/from Liverpool Street station. Train services are operated by the Elizabeth line.

The nearest London Underground station is Newbury Park on the Central line.

Recreation

The area contains many green spaces including Seven Kings Park, a large open space containing sports facilities such as tennis courts, cricket facilities, a sports ground, and a bandstand. There is also Westwood Park, a smaller open space and playground on Meads Lane. Thomas McCurtains GAA are based in Seven Kings Park, it's free to join and offer Camogie, football (male and female teams), hurling and kids sports

Demographics
In the Seven Kings ward of the London Borough of Redbridge, the largest ethnic group in the 2011 census were Indians who comprised 25.5% of the population. The next largest groups were White British at 16.4% and Pakistanis at 13.8%.

The most popular religions were Islam and Christianity at 31.3% and 28.5% of the population respectively. This was followed by Sikhs and Hindus at 13.6% and 12.5% respectively.

References

External links

Areas of London
Districts of the London Borough of Redbridge
Ilford
District centres of London